Zardalu (also Romanized as Zardālū, and Zardlū; also known as Sardāli and Sard Larī) is a village in Balghelu Rural District, in the Central District of Ardabil County, Ardabil Province, Iran. At the 2006 census, its population was 141, in 31 families.

References 

Towns and villages in Ardabil County